The Dodge Series 116 was a middle class automobile made by Dodge from 1923 to 1925 as their main model. Released June 1922, it was the first car ever to have an all steel body. The model was updated in 1924 with a higher hood line, a rear brake light, and new springs. It came equipped with a three-speed standard manual transmission and an advertised 35 horsepower Flathead four-cylinder engine giving the car a top speed of around 45/50 miles an hour. depending on the body style, Luxury optional equipment included door locks, transmission lock, exhaust heater, disk wheels or wood spoke wheels with demountable rims, and roll-down windows.

References

116
Rear-wheel-drive vehicles

Cars introduced in 1923